Miss Chinese International Pageant 2007 was held on January 20, 2007 in Foshan, China.  Foshan would go on to host the pageant for two more years. Miss Chinese International 2006 Ina Lu of Johannesburg, South Africa crowned Sarah Song of Sydney as the new winner. Song is the second winner from Sydney.

Pageant information
The theme to this year's pageant is "International Beauty, Competing in China" 「國際群芳  競艶中華」.  The Masters of Ceremonies include Eric Tsang, Derek Li and Eric Moo.  Special performing guest was cantopop singer Hacken Lee.  This year marked the first year where delegates representing Mainland Chinese regions were able to compete.  This is also the second year where the contest took place in Mainland China (2002 was first).  The delegate from Johannesburg, (20) Ivy Lu is the younger sister of Miss Chinese International 2006, Ina Lu.  Ivy placed 1st runner-up in this year's competition.

Results

Special awards
Miss Friendship: Parichart Wisutthiphat 林雅志 (Bangkok)
Audience Favourite Award: Sirena Wang 王思寧 (New York City)
International Charm Award: Carol Li 李睿 (Pearl River)
Chinese Culture Ambassador Award: Sarah Song 宋熙年 (Sydney)

Contestant list

External links
 Miss Chinese International Pageant 2007 Official Site

TVB
2007 beauty pageants
2007 in China
Beauty pageants in China
Miss Chinese International Pageants